Joel Dwight Barnett (January 2, 1845 - December 9, 1897) served in the California State Assembly for the 24th district. In 1864, during the American Civil War, he served in Company A, 44th Wisconsin Volunteer Infantry Regiment of the Union Army.

References

External links

1845 births
1897 deaths
Union Army soldiers
Republican Party members of the California State Assembly